The 2004 NCAA Division I Women's Lacrosse Championship was the 23rd annual single-elimination tournament to determine the national champion of Division I NCAA women's college lacrosse. The championship game was played at Princeton Stadium in Princeton, New Jersey during May 2004. All NCAA Division I women's lacrosse programs were eligible for this championship. A total of 16 teams were invited to participate. This was also the first tournament to have a total game attendance exceed 10,000 people.

In a rematch of the previous year's final, Virginia defeated Princeton, 10–4, to win their third national championship.

The leading scorer for the tournament was Amy Appelt from Virginia (15 goals). Andrea Pfeiffer, also from Virginia, was named the tournament's Most Outstanding Player.

Qualification

Play-in game

Teams

Tournament bracket

All-tournament team 
Michi Ellers, Georgetown
Coco Stanwick, Georgetown
Lauren Vance, Princeton
Ashley Bastinelli, Vanderbilt
Bridget Morris, Vanderbilt
Katie Norbury, Princeton
Elizabeth Pilion, Princeton
Amy Appelt, Virginia
Caitlin Banks, Virginia
Nikki Lieb, Virginia
Andrea Pfeiffer, Virginia (Most outstanding player)
Elizabeth Pinney, Virginia

See also 
 NCAA Division II Women's Lacrosse Championship 
 NCAA Division III Women's Lacrosse Championship
 2004 NCAA Division I Men's Lacrosse Championship

References

NCAA Division I Women's Lacrosse Championship
NCAA Division I Women's Lacrosse Championship
NCAA Women's Lacrosse Championship